Brockman Highway is a highway in Western Australia. A few hours south of Perth, it runs west from Bridgetown via Nannup to Karridale.

Nannup is situated at the junction of the Vasse Highway and the Brockman Highway.

See also

 Highways in Australia
 List of highways in Western Australia

References

Highways in rural Western Australia